The Kyrgyzstan women's national football team is the female representative football team for Kyrgyzstan.

Although formed immediately after Kyrgyzstan gained independence in 1991, the team played its first competitive match only in 2009, during the qualifiers for the 2010 AFC Women's Asian Cup.

Despite lack of experience, the team managed to progress to the second round of qualifiers, where it was knocked out by stronger rivals Vietnam and Hong Kong.

Not having enough financial support, Kyrgyzstan women's team did not manage to play a single friendly match until the next Asian Cup qualifiers, for the 2014 tournament, where the team took the last place in the group, losing every match.

Results and fixtures

The following is a list of match results in the last 12 months, as well as any future matches that have been scheduled.

Legend

2022

2023

Kyrgyzstan Results and Fixtures – Soccerway.com

Coaching staff

Current coaching staff

Manager history

 Gulbara Umatalieva (2018–2019)
 Valery Berezovsky (2019–present)

Players

Current squad
The following 23 players were named to the squad for the 2022 CAFA Women's Championship from 8 to 20 July 2022.

Caps and goals are accurate up to and including 24 December 2022.

Recent call-ups
The following players have been called up a squad in the past 12 months.

Competitive record

FIFA Women's World Cup

*Draws include knockout matches decided on penalty kicks.

AFC Women's Asian Cup

*Draws include knockout matches decided on penalty kicks.

CAFA Women's Championship

See also
Kyrgyzstan national football team
Kyrgyzstan national under-23 football team
Kyrgyzstan national under-20 football team
Kyrgyzstan national under-17 football team
Kyrgyzstan national futsal team

References

External links
Official website
FIFA profile

 
Asian women's national association football teams
Nat